Bağırlı (also, Bagirovka, Bagirovkend, Bagry, and Bagyrly) is a village and municipality in the Shamakhi Rayon of Azerbaijan.  It has a population of 1,963.

References 

Populated places in Shamakhi District